Distorsio kurzi, common name Kurz's distorsio, is a species of medium-sized sea snail, a marine gastropod mollusk in the family Personidae, the Distortio snails.

Description

Distribution
This marine species occurs off Southeast Africa, the Andamans and in the Western Pacific.

References

External links
 

Personidae
Gastropods described in 1980